The Seaton tramway station is the southern terminus of the Seaton Tramway. The station is situated in the town centre of the town of Seaton in the English county of Devon. The terminus at Seaton opened in 1975, and has since been entirely rebuilt twice. The most recent rebuilding has resulted in the construction of a modern enclosed building suitable for operation all-year round, and which acts as a venue for a range of tramway and community based events.

History

In 1969, Claude Lane, and his company Modern Electric Tramways, acquired the track bed of a section of the former Seaton railway branch between Colyton railway station and a point north of Seaton railway station. The railway branch had closed on 7 March 1966 and his intention was to transfer his  gauge tramway from the town of Eastbourne, where it was threatened by changes to the road system, to Seaton.

By 1975 a new extension has been constructed, diverging from the former railway branch to the north of the line's depot and interim southern terminus, and running west between the holiday camps, that then occupied the land between the town centre and former railway station, and the marshes inland from the town. The line then turned south to a terminus in the  Harbour Road Car Park near the seafront and town centre. The initial layout included no shelter for passengers, with shop and ticket office facilities provided by tram shop car 01, which was towed down and back from the depot each day by the first and last service trams. 

It was not until 1995 that the first permanent building was constructed, which was an Edwardian-inspired steel-and-glass shelter with gazebo-style shop and ticket office, with a revised blocked paved track layout laid at the same time.

After the closure of the adjacent holiday camps in the early 2000s, that site and part of the Harbour Road Car Park were earmarked for extensive redevelopment, with the construction of a Tesco store, Premier Inn hotel, snd a large private housing development. Meanwhile, the brand new Seaton Jurassic Centre was built on part of the Harbour Road Car Park. Both projects involved raising the level of the land and left the Tramway terminus looking out of place, so the Tramway decided to build a contemporary building in order to complement the rest of the regeneration area.

The new station

Construction started in September 2017 and the new station opened on 28 June 2018. During the construction period, Riverside tram stop again operated as the southern terminus of the line and a shuttle bus service was provided between there and the Seaton station site.

It contains a main hall containing a four track terminal layout, as well as a small cafe and shop, toilets, and staff facilities. The new station has been designed with a flush floor throughout, thus enabling the space to also be used for events and exhibitions. One wall accommodates a large screen that can be used for a variety of purposes; during normal operation it displays a live webcam feed from the tramway depot looking down the line and estuary towards Colyford.

The station is fronted by a landscaped pedestrian area, which extends as far as Harbour Road and also provides access to the adjacent Tesco Store and Seaton Jurassic Centre. A bus and coach park lies to one side of the pedestrian area. Because of its raised height and open aspect, the station is highly visible within the town of Seaton.

In 2019, the station won an "Outstanding Achievement" award from the Heritage Railway Association and the "Welcome Accolade" from Visit England.

Operation

Arriving trams terminate in, and departing trams leave from, one of the four terminal tracks in the station building, each of which is capable of accommodating a single tramcar. The four tracks converge into a single track north of the station.

The line operates a daily service between Easter and the end of October. Services operate every 20 minutes between April and September, and every 30 minutes outside that period. In normal operation, trams arriving at Seaton stage forward to operate the next-but-one service out of the station, thus meaning there is always at least one tram in the station.

References

Buildings and structures in Devon
Railway stations in Devon
Seaton, Devon
Tram stops in England

External links
Video of the new tram station under construction and in use
Webcam feed displayed on end wall of station (see above)